The Farm Credit Act of 1933 established the Farm Credit System (FCS) as a group of cooperative lending institutions to provide short-, intermediate-, and long-term loans for agricultural purposes. Specifically, it authorized the Farm Credit Administration (FCA) to create 12 Production Credit Associations (PCAs) and 12 Banks for Cooperatives (BCs) alongside the 12 established Federal Land Banks (FLBs), as well as a Central Bank for Cooperatives.

The Farm Credit Act of 1971 recodified all previous acts governing the Farm Credit System.

See also
 Agricultural Marketing Act of 1929
 Federal Farm Loan Act

External links
 
 
 

1933 in the United States
1933 in law
United States federal agriculture legislation
73rd United States Congress
Farm Credit System